The ringlet (Aphantopus hyperantus) is a butterfly in the family Nymphalidae. It is only one of the numerous "ringlet" butterflies in the tribe Satyrini.

Range

The ringlet is a widely distributed species found throughout much of the Palearctic realm. In Europe it is common in most countries but absent from northern Scandinavia, peninsular Italy (found in northern Italy), Portugal, southern and central Spain (found in Cantabrian Mountains and the eastern Pyrenees), the Mediterranean islands and North Africa. In Greece it is found in northern regions (Macedonia, Thessaly). Beyond Europe it is found across much of temperate Asia including Russia, Siberia, Mongolia, China and Korea.

Description

Aphantopus hyperantus is a medium-sized butterfly with a wingspan of up to 35 to 42 millimeters. The wing upper and lower sides are solid brown with small, yellowish-rimmed eyespots. The newly emerged ringlet has a velvety appearance and is almost black with a white fringe to the wings. The number and size of the eyespots is variable, they may be missing on the upper wing surface. In central Europe and southern England the rare form arete occurs. The eggs are pale yellow when first laid, but become pale brown.

The caterpillars are about 25 millimeters long. They are gray or light reddish brown and have dark, reddish brown and very fine dots. Dorsally there is a dark longitudinal line, which is widened at the segment boundaries. Toward the rear, this line is more intensely colored. The head is darker and has several faint longitudinal stripes.

Color and wing spot variation

Subspecies
ssp. abaensis Yoshino, 2003 - northwestern Sichuan
ssp. alpheois Fruhstorfer, 1908 - Ural, western Siberia
ssp. arctica (Seitz, 1909) - northern Europe
ssp. bieti (Oberthür, 1884) - Sichuan and northern Yunnan
ssp. hyperantus Linnaeus, 1758 - western Europe, the type locality is Sweden
ssp. luti Evans, 1915 - southeastern Tibet
ssp. ocellata (Butler, 1882) (= amurensis Staudinger, 1892; = insularis Kurentzov, 1966) - Amur and Ussuri
ssp. sajana (O. Bang-Haas, 1906) - Sayan Mountains
ssp. sibiricus Obraztsov, 1936 - Altai, southern Siberia and Transbaikalia

Habitat
They live in grassy, moist or dry forest clearings with bushes but not in open places. There is a strong degree of attachment to woodland edges and blackberry bushes. The insect can also be very common where there are creeping thistles (Cirsium arvense) or swamp thistles (Cirsium palustre), oregano (Origanum vulgare), forest scabious (Knautia sylvatica), or hogweed (Heracleum sphondylium) which are favorite food plants of the imagos. The males fly in search of newly hatched females in slow, uninterrupted flight and flutter round, about and between grass stems.

Flight period
A single brood butterfly, the imagines fly from mid-June to late August.

Food of the larva
The caterpillars feed on many grasses. Among the food plants are:

Development and biology
The female scatters non-adhesive eggs in a slow low flight over grasslands. The larva is nocturnal. There are four moults. The larva hibernates while in the third instar, breaking diapause to feed on warm winter evenings. Feeding resumes in the spring. The pupa stands generally upright in a flimsy silk cocoon, at the base of a grass tussock. This stage lasts for two  weeks. A. hyperantus is generally considered to have a closed population structure since it occurs in small, well-defined populations.

Etymology
Hyperantus, of Greek mythology, was one of the 50 sons of Aegyptus, killed by one of the 50 daughters of Danaus.

References

Tom Tolman, Richard Lewington The Butterflies of Europe and Northwest Africa. Nabu-Kosmos, Stuttgart 1998,  *Heiko Bellmann Der neue Kosmos-Schmetterlingsführer, Schmetterlinge, Raupen und Futterpflanzen. Franckh-Kosmos, Stuttgart 2003ISBN 3-440-09330-1
Günter Ebert, Erwin Rennwald (Hrsg.) Tagfalter. 2. Spezieller Teil: Satyridae, Libytheidae, Lycaenidae, Hesperiidae. In: Die Schmetterlinge Baden-Württembergs. 1. Auflage. Band 2, Ulmer, Stuttgart (Hohenheim) 1991, .

External links

Eurobutterflies Matt Rowlings
Moths and Butterflies of Europe and North Africa
UK Butterflies

Aphantopus
Butterflies of Asia
Butterflies of Europe
Butterflies described in 1758
Taxa named by Carl Linnaeus
Taxobox binomials not recognized by IUCN